Third River may refer to:

Third River Township, Itasca County, Minnesota
Third River (Minnesota)
Third River (New Jersey), a tributary of the Passaic River